Île aux Cocos ("Cocos Island") is a small island lying west of Rodrigues in the Indian Ocean.  It is a nature reserve known for its seabird colonies, including the noddy, lesser noddy and fairy tern.

Geography of Rodrigues
Nature reserves of Rodrigues